Nutrients is an open access peer-reviewed scientific journal publishing reviews, regular research papers, and short communications on all aspects of nutrition. It was established in 2009 and is published by MDPI.

Until September 2018, the editor-in-chief was Jonathan Buckley of the University of South Australia. In 2018, Buckley and the other nine senior members of the editorial board resigned, claiming that MDPI "pressured them to accept manuscripts of mediocre quality and importance". The current Editors-in-Chief are Maria Luz Fernandez and Lluis Serra-Majem, who states that MDPI has "confirmed my absolute freedom to decide, basing only on the quality of papers."

As of March 2022 the journal has an impact factor of 5.719. The journal is associated with the Nutrition Society of Australia, Nutrition Society of New Zealand, Spanish Nutrition Foundation, Spanish Nutrition Society and others.

Abstracting and indexing
The journal is abstracted and indexed in:

According to the Journal Citation Reports, the journal has a 2014 impact factor of 3.270, and is ranked 21/77 in the Nutrition and Dietetics category.

See also 
 Australian paradox

References

External links 

Open access journals
MDPI academic journals
English-language journals
Monthly journals
Publications established in 2009
Nutrition and dietetics journals